Virtuoso in New York is an album by American jazz guitarist Joe Pass, recorded in 1975 and released posthumously in 2004.

Track listing
"I Never Knew (That Roses Grew)" (Gus Kahn, Fiorito) – 3:02
"I Don't Stand a Ghost of a Chance with You" (Victor Young, Bing Crosby, Ned Washington) – 5:43
"We'll Be Together Again" (Frankie Laine, Carl Fischer) – 4:44
"Blues for Alagarn" (Joe Pass) – 6:31
"The Way You Look Tonight" (Jerome Kern, Dorothy Fields) – 6:22
"How Long Has This Been Going On? " (George Gershwin, Ira Gershwin) – 4:39
"Moritat" (Bertolt Brecht, Kurt Weill) – 5:52
"When Your Lover Has Gone" (Einar A. Swan) – 6:55
"Blues for Alagarn" (Pass) – 5:40

Personnel
 Joe Pass – guitar

References

2004 albums
Joe Pass albums
Albums produced by Norman Granz
Pablo Records albums